
Call a Bike is a dockless bike hire system run by Deutsche Bahn (DB) in several German cities. Developed in 1998 and in operation since 2000, Call a Bike uses a system of authentication codes to automatically lock and unlock bikes.

Coverage

Availability may be differentiated between cities providing full area coverage, and those only offering bikes at the respective Hauptbahnhof. 
Full citywide coverage is provided in some of the larger cities such as Berlin, Frankfurt, Hamburg, Kassel, Cologne, Munich and Stuttgart. The city of Karlsruhe used to have a citywide system from 2007 until 2013.

Most cities with Intercity-Express (ICE) rail service have at least one Call a Bike location at the station. Those cities include: Aachen, Aschaffenburg, Augsburg, Baden-Baden, Bamberg, Bremen, Bonn, Bielefeld, Braunschweig, Dortmund, Düsseldorf, Erlangen, Freiburg im Breisgau, Flensburg, Fulda, Garmisch-Partenkirchen, Gütersloh, Gotha, Göttingen, Hamm, Halle (Saale), Hanau, Hannover, Heidelberg, Hildesheim, Ingolstadt, Kaiserslautern, Lübeck, Magdeburg, Mainz, Mannheim, Minden, Oberhausen, Oldenburg, Rostock, Saarbrücken, Warnemünde, Weimar, Wolfsburg and Würzburg.

Since early 2014, the stations in the cities of Darmstadt and Wiesbaden are managed by respective municipal or university organizations.

Technology

The system uses an electronic wheel lock and a cable lock, all controlled by embedded microcontroller with touchscreen LC display.  A set of 1024 pregenerated lock/unlock codes are unique to each bike and stored in memory.

Usage
To find the bikes one has to search at the cross roads in the central areas of the towns or use location-based services on modern cell phones to find them.

To hireCustomer calls the telephone number given on the bike which includes the bike's ID and gets by voice the 4 digit opening code, which the customer then types onto the bike's touch screen to unlock it. They can also use the official Call a Bike app, available for iOS, Android, Windows Phone and BlackBerry, to locate a bike and receive the opening code.
To return
Lock the bike to a fixed object, and select "return bike" from the bike's touchscreen.  A code will be generated which then has to be telephoned to the control centre, as proof that the bike was locked. The user also has to give the exact street names of the cross roads, which has to be within the permitted town area. For users of the mobile apps, returning can also be done directly in the app, as long as an internet connection is available.     
From 2013, in some cities, e.g. Cologne, Frankfurt and Munich, this phone call to return a bike is no longer necessary, as the return location is now being transmitted to the control centre by GPS.
Lock temporarilySimilar to returning the bike, except that it doesn't generate a return code.

The cost is 8 cents per minute; holders of a BahnCard get a reduced rate of 6 cent per minute; there are also reduced rates for 24 hours or a week of use. In Stuttgart the first half hour of use is free.  This fee is capped at €15/day.

DB provides local numbers for the phone calls from a cell phone which are required to both hire and return the bikes. Depending on your phone contract, the cost of your phone calls may exceed the price of the bike hire. However, if you are using a German SIM card (which often has a flat rate for calling fixed line numbers), phone calls may be free of charge. As of 2022 there is free roaming within the European Union and flat rates are common.

See also 

 Transport in Germany 
 Outline of cycling

Notes

References

External links 

 Official website, in German
 CCC article on the technical details of the system
  Rental process (Video)

Cycling in Germany
Community bicycle programs
Bicycle sharing in Germany

fr:Vélos en libre-service#Call a Bike